The Combat Ration One Man (CR1M) is a self-contained individual field ration in lightweight packaging procured by the Australian Defence Force for use in combat or other field conditions where organised food facilities are unavailable.

Contents 
The CR1M consists of two vacuum-packed main courses, a midday snack, a number of sundry items (toilet paper, can opener, matches, scouring pad, etc.) and a field ration eating device (FRED).

The contents of the CR1M are produced by various companies within Australia and New Zealand with most of the food and condiments being items commonly found in Australian stores, such as Nestlé's Australian Defence Force Chocolate Ration, Uncle Tobys' Muesli Bars, and Bega Vegemite.

The PR1M and CR5M
Two other close variants of the Combat Ration One Man (CR1M) are the PR1M (Patrol Ration One Man) and the CR5M (Combat Ration 5 Man).

The PR1M is a light weight variant of the CR1M weighing only 60% of the total weight of the CR1M, the main items in it are freeze dried and vacuum sealed to reduce size and weight. It is made to sustain a soldier for 24 hours in combat but can last up to 3 days in a survival situation.

The CR5M is the five-man variant of the CR1M, it is packed in a large box and contains enough food sources to last five troops 24 hours in a combat situation. Unlike the other Australian ration packs this one is not size conscious and is often split up into the packs of troops as it is a means of group feeding.

See also
 List of military rations

Notes

References

External links

Digger History
MREInfo - Australian CR1M

Post–Cold War military equipment of Australia
Military food